The 2009 ITF Men's Circuit was the 2009 edition of the third tier tour for men's professional tennis. It was organised by the International Tennis Federation and is a tier below the ATP Challenger Tour. The ITF Men's Circuit consisted of 493 'Futures' tournaments played year round across six continents, with prize money ranging from $10,000 to $15,000.

Futures events

January

February

March

April

May

June

July

August

September

October

November

December

References

2009
ITF Men's Circuit